SS Minnedosa was one of a pair of transatlantic steam ocean liners that were built in the United Kingdom, launched in 1917 and operated by Canadian Pacific until 1935.

In 1935 Flotte Riuniti Cosulich-Lloyd Sabaudo obtained both ships, renamed them, and converted them into troop ships for the Italian government. Minnedosa was renamed Piemonte, and in 1936 passed to Lloyd Triestino.

In 1942 a Royal Navy submarine torpedoed Piemonte, but she was beached and refloated. On 1943 she was damaged in an Allied air raid and then scuttled. In 1949 she was raised and scrapped.

Building
In 1913 Hamburg America Line ordered a pair of liners from Barclay, Curle & Co. Due to the outbreak of the First World War, Canadian Pacific (CP) bought the two partly built ships and had them completed to its specification.

Barclay, Curle & Co had laid down one of the ships as Medora. CP renamed her Minnedosa. She was launched in Glasgow as yard number 518 and launched her on 17 October 1917. She was then towed to Belfast where Harland & Wolff installed her engines. Her Harland & Wolff yard number was 464.

Minnedosa had three screws. A pair of four-cylinder triple-expansion steam engines drove her port and starboard screws. Exhaust steam from their low-pressure cylinders powered a low-pressure steam turbine that drove her middle screw.

Her holds included  of refrigerated space.

Minnedosa was initially fitted out as a troop ship. CP took delivery of her on 21 November 1918.

UK service
On 5 December 1918 Minnedosa began her maiden voyage from Liverpool to St John, New Brunswick, repatriating troops of the Canadian Expeditionary Force. After trooping duties, Minnedosa began civilian service between Liverpool and Canada. From 1922 to 1927 her route was between Antwerp and St John via Southampton. For a period in the 1920s Minnedosas Master was Captain Ronald Stuart, VC, which entitled her to fly the Blue Ensign.

In 1927 CP put Minnedosa on its route between Britain, Quebec and Montreal. In 1931 she was laid up after having crossed the North Atlantic 129 times. In 1935 CP sold Melita and Minnedosa to breakers in Italy.

Italian service
The sale contract specified that the two ships must be broken up. This clause was breached when the pair were passed to Flotte Riuniti Cosulich-Lloyd Sabaudo, who had them refitted as troop ships for the Italian Government. Minnedosa was renamed Piemonte. She carried troops in the Second Italo-Ethiopian War. In 1936 she was transferred to Lloyd Triestino, which in 1938 put her on its Far East service.

On 17 November 1942 the submarine  torpedoed Piemonte off Capo Rasocolmo in the Mediterranean. She was beached to prevent her sinking, then refloated on 28 December and towed to Messina. In May 1943 Allied aircraft bombed Piemonte in Messina, capsizing her in shallow water. On 15 August she was scuttled in Messina.

In 1949 Piedmonts wreck was raised. She was towed to La Spezia, where she arrived on 24 July to be scrapped.

References

Bibliography

External links

1917 ships
Maritime incidents in November 1942
Maritime incidents in August 1943
Ocean liners of the United Kingdom
Passenger ships of Italy
Ships built in Glasgow
Ships built by Harland and Wolff
Ships built in Ireland
Ships sunk by British aircraft
Steamships of Italy
Steamships of the United Kingdom